The University of Ulsan College of Medicine (UUCM) is the medical school of University of Ulsan, and is located in Songpa-gu, Seoul, South Korea. Founded in 1988, the school moved its campus to Seoul in 2004. Ministry of Education of South Korea ordered its relocation is illegal and ordered relocation to Ulsan.

The Asan Medical Center (AMC), the Ulsan University Hospital, and Gangneung Asan Hospital are its teaching hospitals.

The school has had 450 teachers and 358 undergraduate, 797 master, and 275 doctor graduates since it was founded.

References

Medical schools in South Korea